Jordan Guitton (born 30 January 1995) is a French politician from the National Rally who was elected member of the National Assembly for Aube's 1st constituency in the 2022 French legislative election.

External Links
 His page on the site of the National Assembly

References 

Living people
1995 births
21st-century French politicians
National Rally (France) politicians
Members of Parliament for Aube
Deputies of the 16th National Assembly of the French Fifth Republic